Onkaparinga Hills is a southern suburb of Adelaide, in the City of Onkaparinga. It has a population of 2534 people (2011 Census). It is a leafy suburb that includes parts of the Onkaparinga River National Park.

Nearly 60% of families in the area are couples with children, compared to an Australian average of 45.3%.  The median rent in 2006 was $230. The current median cost of a home in the area is $390 000.  93.5% of people speak English only at home (Australian average 78.5%) and 91% are Australian citizens compared to the Australian average of 86.1%. The Onkaparinga Hills are examples of folding.

History

Prior to European colonisation, the area was inhabited by the Kaurna people. The name Onkaparinga is derived from the Kaurna word ngankiparrinnga, meaning 'The Women's River'.

European settlement dates from the 1840s. Most of the settlers were initially farmers, with vineyards later being established.  After the war there was significant development and again in the early 1990s. The population is now relatively stable.  There are still sections of the area used for vineyards, farming and grazing.

Notes

  Bonzle.com 
  Australian Bureau of Statistics 
  City of Onkaparinga Council Website 
  Aboriginal Culture and History, City of Onkaparinga Council Website 
  History Overview, City of Onkaparinga Council Website 
  Domain Suburb Profile, Domain.com 
  History of the Population, City of Onkaparinga Council Website 

Suburbs of Adelaide